Maple is a neighbourhood in Vaughan, York Region, Ontario, Canada.  It is located northwest of Toronto. Maple was founded as the village of Maple, located at the intersection of Major Mackenzie Drive and Keele Street.

Geography
Maple is located in the Golden Horseshoe of Southern Ontario. To the northeast of is the Oak Ridges Moraine, which supplies a lot of water to the Greater Toronto Area.

The west branch of the Don River rises to the northwest and flows 1 km west of Maple.  Several creeks are to the east and the Black Creek begins slightly west of Vellore. Humber River flows in the west, the Don River flows to the northern and the eastern part. 

York University Keele Campus lies to the south of Steeles Avenue, within the city of Toronto.

Climate
Maple has a continental climate moderated by the Great Lakes and influenced by warm, moist air masses from the south, and cold, dry air from the north.

Transportation

Maple's central cross streets are Major Mackenzie Drive and Keele Street. The nearest major highway exit is 3 km west at Highway 400 and Major Mackenzie, with access also at Highway 400 and Rutherford Rd.

Industrial areas are south and west of Maple, closer to Highway 407, and the Canadian National yards north of Highway 7 (Ontario). Maple is located 13 km NE of Woodbridge, 11 km E of Kleinburg 8 km S of King City, 6.5 km from downtown Richmond Hill 12 km NW of Thornhill N of Highway 401, and SSE of Barrie.

Maple is accessed by the GO Transit Barrie commuter line, with rail stations at Maple and Rutherford GO stations. Toronto Transit Commission, York Region Transit, and GO Transit buses serve the area. The Maple GO Station, built in 1903 by the Grand Trunk Railroad, is a federally designated a heritage railway station.

Maple formerly had a small airport in the west, the Maple Airport, which closed down in 1987.  The runways ran diagonally like the letter x, the runway from northwest to southeast was the longer, and the other ran southwest to northeast.  Streets like Avro, Lockheed, and Mustang on the site of the airport are named after airplanes.

In 2006 Maple gained bus-rapid-transit service under York Region's Transit (YRT) system.

History
The founding families of Maple were the Noble and the Rupert families. The Nobles settled around the present Major Mackenzie Drive and Keele Street intersection in the early half of the 19th century. In 1852 the town was called Noble’s Corner after Joseph Noble, the first Postmaster. Later, a Doctor Rupert lived in Maple and was such a respected member of the community that the town’s name was changed to Rupertsville. Local folklore associates the name "Maple" with the numerous maple trees once found along Keele Street in the town. Maple was dominated for most of the 19th century by the more prosperous towns of Sherwood and Teston. Keele Street was then a boggy swamp area that forced most travelers to take alternate routes. Once the Ontario, Huron, and Simcoe Railway built a line through Maple, the town began to grow. The station was then called Richmond Hill. The Canadian National Railway bought the line in early 1900 and the station was renamed Maple.

Maple, as a centre of agriculture, was enhanced with the proximity of the CNR line, as well as the growing urban development of Toronto. A major Ontario Department of Lands and Forests office was situated there in the 1960s. Housing developments began in the 1960s in the southwest, as well as replacement of homes damaged in the August 1962 fire and explosion at an industrial propane depot.  Massive housing developments did not began until the 1980s in the northwest, near McNaughton.

A gravel pit was in the area north of Major Mackenzie, from the CN line to Dufferin Street. This became the Keele Valley Landfill, which was owned and operated by Metropolitan Toronto, and later by the city of Toronto. The landfill began receiving much of the GTA's garbage when the Beare Road Landfill in Scarborough reached capacity and was decommissioned. The Keele Valley Landfill was closed on New Year's Eve 2002 when it reached its capacity. The site has become reserved for the "Eagle's Nest" golf course, and other developments which will occur in the future once the buried waste decomposes sufficiently.

Canada's Wonderland first opened in 1981.

Maple's proximity to Toronto and its major transportation corridors, and Vaughan's own political support for development, have led to the heavy development and population growth. In 1993, housing development began in the area of what was the Maple Airport. In 1995, it expanded to the western part of Maple. Between 1997 and 1999, urban developments reached the northwestern part of Maple and Melville and the Don to the train tracks.  Developments also reached the northeastern part and the southeastern part.  Megalot houses began developing northeast of Maple near Dufferin in the late-1990s.  The housing developments began up to the Highway 400 in the northwest.  Housing developments have begun near Vellore.

, developments reached the northwestern part as far as Highway 400, Teston Road, the CN line and the southwest.  Most of the housing developments in the early-2000s reached Pine Valley Drive in the southwest in Vellore Village and Vellore Woods.  The housing and urban developments is currently in the west between Highway 400 and Weston and Major Mackenzie and will reach to Teston.

Maple is home to one of the largest mosques in Canada. Baitul Islam Mosque is located on Jane Street south of Teston Road, where a planned subdivision named Peace Village was established in 1999.

Political 
Maple is within the Ontario provincial electoral riding of King-Vaughan, and the MPP is Stephen Lecce. Maple is in the federal riding of King-Vaughan and the MP is Anna Roberts

Nearest communities
Concord, south
Woodbridge, west
Kleinburg, north west
King City, north
Richmond Hill, east
Thornhill, southeast

Notable people
 Max Aitken, better known as First Baron Beaverbrook, was born in the St Andrew's Presbyterian Church Manse in 1879. His father left for a congregation in Newcastle New Brunswick the following year. There is a plaque outside the Church, noting that as Lord Beaverbrook, he donated a carillon.
 Massimo Bertocchi, Olympic decathlete.
 Luca Caputi - ice hockey player IK Oskarshamn of the Swedish HockeyAllsvenskan
 Justin DiBenedetto - ice hockey player
 Phil Di Giuseppe - ice hockey player drafted into the NHL as the 38th draft pick in 2012 by the Carolina Hurricanes.
 Lucas Lessio - ice hockey player drafted into the NHL as the 56th draft pick in 2011 by the Phoenix Coyotes.
 Mendelson Joe - artist was raised in Maple.
 Adam Mascherin - ice hockey player
 Tyler Medeiros - a teen singer born in Maple.
 Andi Petrillo - sports anchor was raised in Maple.
 Dr. Fredrick William Routley - practiced medicine in Maple from 1909 to 1912. He was the Chief Executive Officer of the Canadian Red Cross for 27 years. In 1923 he developed the Blue Cross Plan  which was put into effect in Ontario in 1941. Dr. Routley also helped establish the Ontario Hospital Association in 1923.
 Martina Sorbara, lead singer and songwriter of Juno-Award-winning band Dragonette; grew up on a farm in Maple.
 Stuck On Planet Earth - a Canadian independent rock band

References

1.  

Neighbourhoods in Vaughan